Tarutino may refer to the following places:

Tarutino, Russia
 Battle of Tarutino in the 1812 French invasion of Russia
Tarutyne, Ukraine, also known as Tarutino in Bulgarian and Romanian